Jennifer Warling (born 25 March 1994) is a karateka from Luxembourg. She won the gold medal in the women's kumite 55 kg event at the 2019 European Karate Championships held in Guadalajara, Spain. She also won a medal in this event at this competition in 2014 and 2015. She also represented Luxembourg at the 2019 European Games held in Minsk, Belarus and she won one of the bronze medals in the women's kumite 55 kg event.

Career 

She won the silver medal in the women's kumite 55 kg event at the 2014 European Karate Championships held in Tampere, Finland. In 2015, she competed in the women's kumite 55 kg event at the European Games held in Baku, Azerbaijan. She did not advance to compete in the semi-finals.

In 2019, she won the gold medal in the women's kumite 55 kg event at the European Karate Championships held in Guadalajara, Spain. In the same year, she also won one of the bronze medals in the women's kumite 55 kg event at the 2019 European Games held in Minsk, Belarus.

In June 2021, she competed at the World Olympic Qualification Tournament held in Paris, France hoping to qualify for the 2020 Summer Olympics in Tokyo, Japan. She reached the semi-finals where she lost against Moldir Zhangbyrbay of Kazakhstan. In November 2021, she lost her bronze medal match in the women's 55 kg event at the World Karate Championships held in Dubai, United Arab Emirates.

She lost her bronze medal match in the women's kumite 55 kg at the 2022 World Games held in Birmingham, United States.

Achievements

References

External links 
 

Living people
1994 births
Place of birth missing (living people)
Luxembourgian female karateka
European Games medalists in karate
European Games bronze medalists for Luxembourg
Karateka at the 2015 European Games
Karateka at the 2019 European Games
Competitors at the 2022 World Games
21st-century Luxembourgian women